Nay Kyauk Khae is a 1983 Burmese black-and-white drama film, directed by Thin Thin Yu starring Kyaw Hein, Swe Zin Htaik, Khin Thida Htun, Aung Lwin, Htun Htun Naing and Nwet Nwet San.

Cast
Kyaw Hein as Nay Kyauk Khae
Swe Zin Htaik as Phyu Hnin
Khin Thida Htun as Moe
Aung Lwin as Dr. Min Kyaw
Htun Htun Naing as Bo Bo
Nwet Nwet San as Daw Nan Htay

References

1983 films
1980s Burmese-language films
Films shot in Myanmar
Burmese black-and-white films
1983 drama films